Ashani Tanuja Weeraratna (born ) is a Sri Lanka-born American cancer researcher whose findings are contributing to the scientific understanding of melanoma tumors. She is a Bloomberg Distinguished Professor of cancer biology and the E.V. McCollum Professor and Chair of the department of biochemistry and molecular biology at the Johns Hopkins Bloomberg School of Public Health. Weeraratna is a member of the National Cancer Advisory Board, which advises and assists the director of the National Cancer Institute on the activities of the national cancer program. 

She was head of the Weeraratna Lab at the Wistar Institute. At the Wistar Institute, Weeraratna was a full professor and co-program leader of the Immunology, Microenvironment, and Metastasis Program at the Wistar Institute and the program director of the cancer biology program at the University of the Sciences.

Early life and education 
Weeraratna was born in Sri Lanka and raised in Lesotho. From the age of 15, she wanted to become a cancer researcher. In 1988, due to apartheid, Weeraratna left Southern Africa at the age of 17 to study biology at St. Mary's College of Maryland. She earned a bachelor's degree in 1991. Weeraratna obtained a Master's in Philosophy from George Washington University in 1997, during which time she met the Hand. She earned a doctorate in Molecular and Cellular Oncology from the Columbian College of Arts and Sciences of the George Washington University Medical Center. Her 1998 dissertation was titled Loss of Uteroglobin Expression in Metastatic Human Prostate Cancer. Steven Patierno was her doctoral advisor. From 1998 to 2000, Weeraratna completed post-graduate training and was a postdoctoral fellow in experimental therapeutics and pharmacology at the Johns Hopkins Sidney Kimmel Comprehensive Cancer Center, then known as the Johns Hopkins Oncology Center. From there, she went on to become a Staff Scientist in the laboratory of Jeff Trent, then Scientific Director of the National Human Genome Research Institute, at the National Institutes of Health. It was here that she followed up on the discovery by Dr Trent, and Dr. Michael Bittner, of the non-canonical Wnt signaling molecule, Wnt5A in melanoma. She spent the next decade or so of her career trying to understand the role of Wnt5A in melanoma metastasis.

Career

Cancer research 
In 2007, Weeraratna worked in the Laboratory of Immunology at the National Institute on Aging. Weeraratna joined the Wistar Institute in 2011, first as an assistant professor and then as an associate professor and program leader of the Tumor Microenvironment and Metastasis Program at Wistar Institute. In 2014, she was the recipient of an R01 grant from the National Cancer Institute. In 2015, her research encompassed the effects of aging on skin and the corresponding changes in tumor growth. She was named the Ira Brind associate professor, in 2016. In receiving the professorship, Wistar Institute president and CEO, Dario Altieri remarked that "Dr. Weeraratna has demonstrated outstanding scientific initiative and is a great ambassador for our Institute...she is changing the way we understand melanoma, as she and her team seek ways to prevent and treat this dangerous disease. Under her leadership, we look forward to continued innovation and growth during these exciting times of research expansion at Wistar." In 2018, Dr. Weeraratna is head of the Weeraratna Lab at the Wistar Institute. The lab researches molecular mechanisms related to melanoma metastasis, especially the Wnt signaling pathway. Weeraratna also investigates how changes to tumor microenvironment, especially aging, can change melanoma growth and the development of therapeutic resistance.

In 2018, Weeraratna became a full professor and co-program leader of the Immunology, Microenvironment, and Metastasis Program at the Wistar Institute. Until 2018, she was the program director of the Cancer Biology doctorate program at University of the Sciences. 

Weeraratna joined Johns Hopkins University in 2019 as a Bloomberg Distinguished Professor of cancer biology. She will serve as the first female E.V. McCollum Professor and Chair of the department of biochemistry and molecular biology at the Johns Hopkins Bloomberg School of Public Health (JHSPH). In this role, she will continue her melanoma research and expand the aging and cancer programs at JHSPH. Weeraratna holds a joint appointment in the Johns Hopkins School of Medicine department of oncology and the Sidney Kimmel Comprehensive Cancer Center. In 2020, Weeraratna will serve as president of the Society of Melanoma Research. 

In September 2021, President Joe Biden appointed Weeraratna as one of seven clinicians and researchers to the National Cancer Advisory Board, which advises the director of the National Cancer Institute on activities of the national cancer program.

Activism 
In June 2018, Weeraratna spoke at a Families Belong Together protest in Norristown, Pennsylvania. She revealed the difficulties she faced while emigrating without family to pursue the American Dream. Weeraratna spoke out against the Trump administration family separation policy, instead highlighting the scientific achievements and economic growth attributed to immigrants in the United States. She urged others to exercise their right to vote, stating that she was only recently able to do so because she is an immigrant.

Selected works 

 Pubmed citations
 Google Scholar citations

Books

 Is Cancer Inevitable?, Johns Hopkins University Press, 2021.

Selected Articles

References

External links
 

1970s births
20th-century American scientists
20th-century American women scientists
20th-century Sri Lankan women
21st-century American scientists
21st-century American women scientists
21st-century Sri Lankan women
American civil rights activists
American women biologists
Cancer researchers
George Washington University School of Medicine & Health Sciences alumni
Johns Hopkins University fellows
National Institutes of Health people
Sri Lankan emigrants to the United States
Sri Lankan women scientists
St. Mary's College of Maryland alumni
University of the Sciences faculty
Living people
Columbian College of Arts and Sciences alumni
Lesotho educators
Immigrants to Lesotho
Lesotho emigrants to the United States
Johns Hopkins Bloomberg School of Public Health faculty
Biden administration personnel